Antonius Cleveland (born February 2, 1994) is an American professional basketball player for the Hapoel Eilat of the Israeli Basketball Premier League. He played college basketball at Southeast Missouri State University.

Early life and high school career
Cleveland was born in Memphis, Tennessee, as the only child of mother Shonda Bowie. Bowie worked two jobs to support herself and Cleveland: as a nutrition supervisor for Memphis City Schools during the day and with FedEx during the night.

Cleveland started his basketball career at Overton High School in Memphis for his freshman and sophomore seasons. He transferred to Germantown High School in nearby Germantown for his junior season. Cleveland spent his senior year at Faith Baptist Christian Academy in Ludowici, Georgia.

College career
Cleveland played for Southeast Missouri State University for four seasons, where he was the team's leading scorer in his junior (15.2 PPG) and senior (16.6 PPG) years. He was selected to the All-Ohio Valley Conference (OVC) first-team in 2017.

Professional career

Dallas Mavericks (2017)
After going undrafted in the 2017 NBA draft, Cleveland signed with the Portland Trail Blazers to join their roster for the 2017 NBA Summer League. While playing for Portland, he averaged 5.8 ppg in six games coming off the bench. On July 27, 2017, Cleveland signed with the Golden State Warriors on a training camp deal. On September 30, Cleveland was waived by the Warriors. He'd then be assigned to the Santa Cruz Warriors NBA G League affiliate team on October 24, 2017.

On November 17, 2017, Cleveland signed a two-way contract with the Dallas Mavericks. He made his NBA debut later that night in a 111–87 blowout loss to the Minnesota Timberwolves, recording 2 points and 2 rebounds in 6 minutes of play. Throughout his time on that two-way deal, he would split his playing time between the Mavericks and their G League affiliate, the Texas Legends. On December 18, 2017, he was injured in a 97–91 loss to the Phoenix Suns. He was waived from the team a day later, with his spot on the team being replaced by Kyle Collinsworth.

Atlanta Hawks (2018)
On February 22, 2018, the Atlanta Hawks signed Cleveland to a 10-day contract. He signed his second 10-day contract with Atlanta on March 4. On March 14, 2018, Atlanta signed Cleveland to a multi-year contract. On July 21, 2018, Cleveland was placed on waivers by the Hawks.

On July 23, 2018, the Chicago Bulls claimed Cleveland off waivers. He was waived by the Bulls on October 12, 2018. He re-joined the Santa Cruz Warriors for the 2018–19 season.

Return to Dallas (2019–2020)
On July 25, 2019, Cleveland re-signed with the Dallas Mavericks on a two-way contract with the Texas Legends. He averaged 14.4 points and 7.3 rebounds for the G League Legends.

Oklahoma City Blue (2021)
On December 3, 2020, Cleveland signed with the Oklahoma City Thunder, but was waived the same day. He then joined the Thunder's G League affiliate, the Oklahoma City Blue.

Illawarra Hawks (2021–2022)
On August 2, 2021, Cleveland signed with the Illawarra Hawks in Australia for the 2021–22 NBL season. He was named the NBL Best Defensive Player.

Adelaide 36ers and Hapoel Eilat (2022–present)
On June 9, 2022, Cleveland signed a two-year deal with the Adelaide 36ers. He earned a second consecutive NBL Best Defensive Player Award in 2023.

On February 8, 2023, Cleveland signed with Hapoel Eilat of the Israeli Basketball Premier League for the 2023 NBL off-season.

Career statistics

NBA

Regular season

|-
| style="text-align:left;"| 
| style="text-align:left;"| Dallas
| 13 || 0 || 6.2 || .286 || .000 || .500 || .8 || .2 || .5 || .3 || .8
|-
| style="text-align:left;"| 2017–18
| style="text-align:left;"| Atlanta
| 4 || 0 || 10.5 || .571 || 1.000 || 1.000 || 1.0 || .0 || .3 || .3 || 3.3
|-
| style="text-align:left;"| 
| style="text-align:left;"| Dallas
| 11 || 0 || 4.2 || .286 || .000 || .600 || .6 || .1 || .1 || .3 || 1.0
|- class="sortbottom"
| style="text-align:center;" colspan="2"| Career
| 28 || 0 || 6.0 || .343 || .429 || .636 || .8 || .1 || .3 || .3 || 1.2

Playoffs

|-
| style="text-align:left;"| 2020
| style="text-align:left;"| Dallas
| 2 || 0 || 4.5 || .400 || .000 || .000 || .5 || .0 || .5 || .0 || 2.0
|- class="sortbottom"
| style="text-align:center;" colspan="2"| Career
| 2 || 0 || 4.5 || .400 || .000 || .000 || .5 || .0 || .5 || .0 || 2.0

College

|-
| style="text-align:left;"| 2013–14
| style="text-align:left;"| Southeast Missouri State
| 32 || 21 || 22.3 || .525 || .359 || .596 || 2.8 || 1.7 || 1.0 || .5 || 9.1
|-
| style="text-align:left;"| 2014–15
| style="text-align:left;"| Southeast Missouri State
| 30 || 30 || 29.0 || .472 || .211 || .568 || 4.8 || 1.8 || 1.3 || .5 || 10.8
|-
| style="text-align:left;"| 2015–16
| style="text-align:left;"| Southeast Missouri State
| 26 || 24 || 31.4 || .437 || .174 || .610 || 6.6 || 2.3 || 1.6 || .6 || 15.2
|-
| style="text-align:left;"| 2016–17
| style="text-align:left;"| Southeast Missouri State
| 33 || 33 || 32.9 || .543 || .384 || .660 || 5.1 || 2.2 || 1.4 || .9 || 16.6
|- class="sortbottom"
| style="text-align:center;" colspan="2"| Career
| 121 || 108 || 28.8 || .494 || .288 || .612 || 4.7 || 2.0 || 1.3 || .6 || 12.9

References

External links

Southeast Missouri State Redhawks bio
Antonius Cleveland at basketball.realgm.com

1994 births
Living people
21st-century African-American sportspeople
African-American basketball players
American expatriate basketball people in Australia
American men's basketball players
Atlanta Hawks players
Basketball players from Memphis, Tennessee
Dallas Mavericks players
Hapoel Eilat basketball players
Illawarra Hawks players
Oklahoma City Blue players
Santa Cruz Warriors players
Shooting guards
Southeast Missouri State Redhawks men's basketball players
Texas Legends players
Undrafted National Basketball Association players